Ormopteris is a genus of ferns in the subfamily Cheilanthoideae of the family Pteridaceae. Species are native to Brazil and Venezuela.

Species
, the Checklist of Ferns and Lycophytes of the World recognized the following species:
Ormopteris crenata (R.M.Tryon) Barbará
Ormopteris cymbiformis (J.Prado) Barbará
Ormopteris flavescens (Fée) Barbará
Ormopteris gleichenioides (Gardner) J.Sm.
Ormopteris pinnata (Kaulf.) Lellinger
Ormopteris riedelii (Baker) Barbará

References

Pteridaceae
Fern genera